Imma niphopelta is a moth of the family Immidae. It is found in New Guinea.

Subspecies
Imma niphopelta niphopelta
Imma niphopelta lutescens Diakonoff, 1955

References

Immidae
Moths described in 1930
Moths of New Guinea